Athavanad  is a village in the Tirur Taluk, in the Malappuram District of the state of Kerala, India. The town lies on the National Highway 17, between Kuttippuram and Valanchery. Puthanathani is the main town of the Athavanad village and the village office is located in Athavanad Para & Kurumbathoor. Nearby towns include Valanchery, Kalpakanchery, Tavanur, Tirunavaya, Kuttippuram, Irimbiliyam, and Edayur. 

Athavanad  is also famous for historical  Azhvanchery Mana which built about 400 years ago.

Etymology

In Malayalam, "Athavanad" is an abbreviation of "Azhvanchery Thambrakkal Vazhunna Nadu". The region was under the rule of the Azhvanchery Thamprakkal feudal lords in ancient times. Azhvanchery Thamprakkal were usually present at the Ariyittu Vazhchaof a new Zamorin of Calicut. The original headquarters of Palakkad Rajas were also at Athavanad.

Industries
Athavanad has some industries.  Athavanad is home to several public enterprises in the textile industry.
 The MALCOTEX (Malabar Co-operative Textiles Limited) is headquartered at Athavanad.
 KELTEX (Kerala Hi-Tech Textile  Cooperative Limited) is also located here.

Demographics
As of the 2011 Census of India, Athavanad had a population of 20,480. 9,612 (47%) are men, and around 11,000 (53%) are women. The population density is approximately 1,524 people per square kilometer. Children under the age of six make up 14% of Athavanad's population.

Malayalam is the most spoken language.

Culture

Religion 
Athavanad is predominantly Hindu and Muslim; thus, these two religions have a strong influence on local cultural traditions. Teeyate, Thiruvathira, Duff Muttu, Kolkali, and Aravanamuttu are popular traditions. Temples and mosques are common gathering places for both social and religious reasons.

Temples 
 Pacheeri Sri Krishna Temple
 Pottekalathil Bhagwathi Kshetram
 Mahadeva Temple, Painkanur
 Kottayil Mahadeva Kshethram
 Swamy Ayyappa Temple
 Sri Parakkunnathu Bhagavathy Kshethram

Mosques 
 Athavanad Old Juma Masjid
 Najath Masjid Ponnandikulambu
 Nannekara Juma Masjid
 Mattummal Town Masjid
 Athavanad Parithi Juma masjid
 Athavanad Para Town Masjid
 Thekkekulambu Masjid
 DIM Masjid Ponnandikulamb
 Vadekkekulambu Juma Masjid
 Markaz Campus Masjid
 Badariyya Masjid Plathani
 Palathani Masjid
 PMSA Campus Masjid
 Kattilangadi Town Masjid

Sports 
Athavanad has a long history of playing football.

Events 
The Kerala Cattle Race (known as Kalappoottu and Maramadi) is a traditional event. It was banned in 2014 by a court ruling, as it was deemed to violate a 1960 law pertaining to preventing animal cruelty.

Attractions 
 Ayyapanov Waterfall, the most famous waterfall in Malappuram, and situated in Athavanad Kattilangadi.
 Chingili Mada, a natural cave 3 km from Athavanad.

Education
Athavanad is a major educational hub. It has several educational institutions ranging from primary to post-secondary. It also has several libraries and a literacy rate of over 90%. The majority of books are written Malayalam, English, and Sanskrit. Some are written in Arabi-Malayalam, a version of the Malayalam language written in the Arabic script.

Educational institutions 
 Athavanad Parithi High school
 Athavanad Mattummal Higher Secondary School
 Markazu Tharbiyathul Islam Higher Secondary School
 Markaz Residential School
 Markazu Tharbiyathul Teachers Training Center
 Markazu Tharbiyathul Islam
 Markazu Tharbiyathul Islam B-Ed
 Badariyya Arabic College, Palathani
 PMSA Orphanage Hospital, Athavanad Kattilangadi
 Markaz Arts and Science College
 KMCT Polytechnic College
 KMCT Law College
 Z.M.H.S Poolamangalam
 Majmau Orphanage
 Mohammed Ali Shihab Thangal Memorial Arts And Science College
 Majmau Higher Secondary School
 Majmau Thazkiyath Islamiya

Transportation

Road 
 Athavanad is connected to other parts of India through Kottakkal.
 National highway No.66 passes through Tanur and the northern stretch connects to Goa and Mumbai.  The southern stretch connects to Cochin and Trivandrum.  
 State Highway No.28 starts from Nilambur and connects to Ooty, Mysore and Bangalore through Highways.12,29 and 181. 
 National Highway No.966 connects to Palakkad and Coimbatore.

Air 
 The nearest airport is at Karipur International Airport.

Rail 
 Kuttippuram station
 Thirunavaya station
 Perashshannur station
 Tirur station 
 Trichur is major railway station 49 km from Athavanad

Bus 
 Bus lines from Kuttippuram
 Bus lines from Puthanathani 
 Bus lines from Vettichira

Notable people
 Melpathur Narayana Bhattathiri
 Mohsin Peramban

See also
 Azhvanchery Thamprakkal
 Athavanad Grama Panchayat
 Ayyapanov WaterFalls

References

Cities and towns in Malappuram district
Populated waterside places in India
Kottakkal area
Tourism in Malappuram district